A braña is a seasonal pasture in the Cantabrian Mountains of northwest Spain, particularly in Asturias, Cantabria, and northern León. Brañas support several types of transhumance and can be used during different periods of the year, though the word is most often associated with summer usage.

Brañas are located in the mountains and hills far above towns, usually at between 700 and 1800 meters in altitude. Winter brañas are located at lower altitudes closer to towns, while summer brañas are located higher up in the mountains.

Etymology

The word braña most likely comes from the Latin verania meaning “summer” (compare Asturian branu, “summer”). However, some authors attribute the word to Proto-Celtic *brakna, “wetland”, which is the meaning of braña in Galician.

In the eastern Cantabrians, the term invernal is often used to refer specifically to winter pastures and in central and eastern Asturias the term majada, mayada, mayáu, or mayéu is sometimes used instead of braña for pastures of all seasons.

The Pasiegos of the Valley of Pas use the word braniza in place of braña.

Architecture
Characteristic of the brañas are several types of small stone huts for pastors, Vaqueiros, and their livestock. The most common are small structures called cabañas that have a square or rectangular layout. Siding is made of stone, most often slate, and the roof is made of stone, tile, or wood. These huts are for the pastor or Vaqueiro while smaller similar huts called cortes are for the livestock.

 
Small stone huts with a circular layout are called corros or chozos and are most often used as shelter for calves. Roofs are made of stone but sometimes have grass grown on them.

Teitos are stone houses with arched roofs made of straw which are common in southwestern Asturias, especially Somiedo. The most famous teitos are in the braña of Pornacal, which today serves as a tourist attraction.

Transhumance

Non-Vaqueiros that practice transhumance in the Cantabrians practice a short-range form. They have three types of brañas: winter brañas, summer brañas, and brañas used in between seasons called brañas equinocciales. Cattle, horses, and smaller livestock such as sheep, goats, and pigs spend time in the brañas, though goats more often spend the whole year in open pastures. Today, the brañas are most often only used for cattle.

In non-Vaqueiro brañas, usually only a single family member goes to the braña with the livestock, while the rest of the family stays in the town. Structures in these brañas provide temporary shelter for the pastor and their livestock against the elements.

Transhumant pastors spend June to August in the summer braña and September, October, and March through May in the brañas equinocciales. From November through February, they live in the town while the livestock lives in the winter braña nearby.

Vaqueiros de Alzada

The Vaqueiro people live with their whole families and spend their lives in the brañas, which are their ancestral homes. Their primary livestock is cattle but they began to raise smaller livestock alongside cattle in the 20th century. Vaqueiro brañas are mostly situated in the west of Asturias and León.

Unlike non-Vaqueiro transhumant pastors, Vaqueiros traditionally practice long-range transhumance with a minority practicing medium range transhumance to summer brañas closer to the coast. Also contrasting non-Vaqueiro pastors, Vaqueiros have two types of brañas: a summer braña and a winter braña. They do not have brañas equinocciales.

Vaqueiros call their journey between brañas, particularly the journey up to the summer braña, the alzada, or “raising”, because they “raise” their homes. The Vaqueiros living the farthest west spend less time in the summer braña (June to August) than the eastern-most Vaqueiros who spend the most time in the summer braña (April to October).

Vaqueiros are semi-nomadic pastoralists and the brañas are their traditional homes. Because of this, the structures in Vaqueiro brañas are usually permanent and intended for more than temporary shelter from the elements.

Flora and Fauna

Many alpine plant species and orchids can be found in the brañas including gentians, saxifrages, and rock jasmines, and at the highest brañas even some arctic plant species such as moss campion and purple saxifrage.

There are endemic animal species native to the braña areas of the Cantabrian Mountains such as Cantabrian brown bears, Cantabrian chamois, and Cantabrian capercaillies alongside endemic Cantabrian plant species.

Today
Many brañas today are abandoned, particularly those especially difficult to reach, but some are still used, usually just for cattle.

Abandoned brañas are popular hiking spots, and throughout southwest Asturias can be found many official hiking trails that go through these brañas. Other brañas have been restored and turned into tourist attractions.

Vaqueiros still live in their brañas though they experience a declining population due to rural flight and a declining Vaqueiro population. Many Vaqueiro brañas, particularly winter brañas, gained town infrastructure, services, and town status in the late 20th century, leading to their denomination as braña-pueblos, or “braña-towns”.

Many brañas can be found within the UNESCO Biosphere Reserves of Somiedo, Valle de Laciana, Babia, Las Ubiñas-La Mesa and the Natural Park of Fuentes del Narcea, Degaña, and Ibias.

Bibliography

References

Transhumance
Nomads
Cantabrian Mountains
Vaqueiros de alzada
Asturian culture
Cantabrian culture
Agriculture in Spain